"Para Tu Amor" is a song written and performed by Colombian singer-songwriter Juanes. The song is the follow-up radio single to his break-through hit single "La Camisa Negra", from his studio album, Mi Sangre.

Track listing
"Para Tu Amor" – 4:08 (Juan Esteban Aristizabal)

Charts

Certifications

References

2005 singles
Juanes songs
Pop ballads
Songs written by Juanes
Song recordings produced by Gustavo Santaolalla
Spanish-language songs
Universal Music Latino singles
2004 songs